Senna odorata, which is also known as fragrant senna, spreading cassia, sweet-scented cassia or southern cassia, is a species of flowering plant in the legume family that is native to Australia.

Description

It has paripinnate alternate leaves, with six to 12 pairs of leathery textured, slender, oval leaflets. 

Flowers are bright yellow and cup-shaped, arranged in small clusters or in panicles. They are lightly fragrant (hence the specific epithet odorata, meaning odorous). The flowering period extends from late winter to spring. The fruits are flat legume pods with many small seeds.

Distribution
This species is native to the forest edges of Australia (southern Queensland, south to New South Wales), usually in dry sclerophyll forest. It has been introduced in India and Mauritius. 

In its habitat, the plant can tolerate drought, light frost and high wind.

Gallery

References

External links
Tropicos
Encyclopedia of Life
Dave’s Garden

odorata
Flora of New South Wales
Flora of Queensland
Garden plants of Australia